Crowns Down (stylized as CrownsDown) is the third studio album by American hip hop duo Themselves. It was released on Anticon in 2009. A remix version of the album, Crowns Down & Company, was released in 2010.

Critical reception
At Metacritic, which assigns a weighted average score out of 100 to reviews from mainstream critics, the album received an average score of 72% based on 7 reviews, indicating "generally favorable reviews".

Brian Howe of Pitchfork gave the album a 6.7 out of 10 and described it as "a back-to-basics album from a group who probably needs one, having ventured so far afield." Thomas Quinlan of Exclaim! said, "Themselves may not have snatched the crown but they've certainly thrown down the gauntlet with CrownsDown, their confident and comfortable return to the royal rap court."

BBC Music named it one of the best albums of 2009.

Track listing

Personnel
Credits adapted from liner notes.

Themselves
 Doseone – vocals, production
 Jel – vocals, production

Additional musicians
 D-Styles – turntables (3)
 Jordan Dalrymple – vocals (5)
 Markus Acher – vocals (5)
 Dax Pierson – vocals (6)

Technical personnel
 Odd Nosdam – mixing 
 Yoni Wolf – mixing
 Mike Wells – mastering
 Doseone  – photography
 Matthew Scott – photography
 K Photo – photography

References

External links
 

2009 albums
Themselves albums
Anticon albums